Kelly Clark (August 9, 1957 – December 17, 2013) was an American lawyer and legislator.

Born in Little Rock, Arkansas, he lived there and in Colorado Springs, Colorado. He received his B.A. degree in political science from Lewis & Clark College and his J.D. degree from Lewis & Clark Law School and practiced law in Portland, Oregon. He served in the Oregon House of Representatives as a Republican 1989–93.

He died in Rochester, Minnesota at the age of 56.

References

External links
Portland attorney Kelly Clark dies, was nationally recognized as defender of sex-abuse victims - The Oregonian
Kelly Clark, Lawyer Who Won Boy Scouts Abuse Case, Dies at 56 - The New York Times
High profile cases

1957 births
2013 deaths
Politicians from Little Rock, Arkansas
Politicians from Colorado Springs, Colorado
Lawyers from Portland, Oregon
Lewis & Clark College alumni
Lewis & Clark Law School alumni
Republican Party members of the Oregon House of Representatives
Lawyers from Little Rock, Arkansas
20th-century American lawyers